The Johnstone River, comprising the North Johnstone River and the South Johnstone River, is a river system located in Far North and  North Queensland, Australia.

The headwaters of the river system rise in the Atherton Tablelands. The main river then flows east, north of the Moresby Range National Park, and empties into the Coral Sea.

Crocodiles swim & live in all areas in the Johnstone River and swimming is not recommended in any part of the river.

Course and features
The North and South Johnstone Rivers rise in the tablelands of the north tropical coast and flow through steep narrow gorges to their junction on the coastal plain at Innisfail. The head waters of the catchments are located in high rainfall areas and the rivers are capable of producing severe flooding, especially in the Innisfail area.

Major tributaries of the river system include the North Beatrice River and the Ithaca River that both flow into the North Johnstone River. This branch is the longest and its catchment is drawn from the Malanda Falls Conservation Park, and the following national parks: Ella Bay, Eubenangee Swamp, Herberton Range, Japoon, Malaan, Palmerston Rocks, Topaz Road, Tully Falls, Tully Gorge and Wooroonooran. Malanda Falls is located in the upper reaches of the North Johnstone River. Downey Creek is the only major tributary on the South Johnstone River. 

There are no dams or reservoirs in the catchment area. However water is taken from the river for town water supply, dairy farming and sugar cane production.

The river is subject to periodic flooding (On the 8th of March 2018 the Johnstone burst its banks cutting off Innisfail from Cairns) popular for white-water rafting, and other tourist activities.

History

The junction of the two river branches is considered to be a sacred area to the indigenous Mamu people. 

The area was first identified by colonial Europeans in 1872 by Captain John Morseby during the search for survivors of the shipwreck Maria, when he named the river the Gladys . Later, in 1873, Dalrymple renamed the river after Sub-Inspector Robert Johnstone while he was on an expedition searching for an alternative port for the Palmer River goldfields. Robert Johnstone was along on both trips as the sub-inspector in charge of the Native Mounted Police at Cardwell.

In 1881 the first sugar cane plantation and mill were established at Innisfail after G. E. Dalrymple reported suitable land on the Johnstone River.

Crossings
The Jubilee Bridge was built across the river at Innisfail in 1923, replacing a ferry service. The old Jubilee Bridge was closed on 21 May 2010 after a review found the bridge to be unsafe. A new bridge was opened on 2 September 2011 with a ceremony attended by the then Queensland Premier, Anna Bligh, Queensland MP Curtis Pitt and local Mayor Bill Shannon.

The opening of the railway bridge across the North Johnstone river at Daradgee in December 1924 provided the final link in the North Coast railway line from Townsville to Cairns.

The North Johnstone River also has two crossings on the Bruce Hwy and Shaw Rd.

See also

Mosquito Fleet (Johnstone River, Queensland)
Syzygium erythrocalyx, known as the Johnstone River satinash

References

External links

North Queensland
Rivers of Far North Queensland
Bodies of water of the Coral Sea